Nearly a Nasty Accident is a 1961 British comedy film directed by Don Chaffey and starring Jimmy Edwards, Kenneth Connor, Shirley Eaton and Eric Barker.

A mechanically minded but accident-prone aircraftman (Kenneth Connor) creates chaos and arouses the anger of a promotion-seeking Group Captain (Jimmy Edwards).

Cast
 Jimmy Edwards as Group Captain Kingsley
 Kenneth Connor as AC 2 Alexander Wood
 Shirley Eaton as Corporal Jean Briggs
 Eric Barker as Air Minister
 Jon Pertwee as General Birkinshaw
 Ronnie Stevens as Flight Lieutenant Pocock
 Richard Wattis as Wagstaffe
 Joyce Carey as Lady Trowborough
 Peter Jones as Flight Lieutenant Winters
 Terry Scott as Sam Stokes
 Charlotte Mitchell as Miss Chamberlain
 Jack Watling as Flight Lieutenant Grogan
 Joe Baker as Watkins
 Jack Douglas as Balmer
 Cyril Chamberlain as Warrant Officer Breech
 John Forrest as Flight Lieutenant Bunthorpe
 Vincent Ball as Sergeant at Crybwyth
 Harold Goodwin as Aircraft Mechanic

Critical response
The New York Times called the film "essentially a one-joke comedy hanging on the thinnest of plots." TV Guide said "Connor is a soldier who is obsessed with repairing things and is fascinated with anything mechanical, in this cute British comedy".

References

External links
 Nearly a Nasty Accident at the Internet Movie Database

1961 films
British comedy films
1961 comedy films
1960s English-language films
Films directed by Don Chaffey
Military humor in film
1960s British films